Otto Gold (18 May 1909 – 7 April 1977) was a Czechoslovak figure skater and coach.

Gold, who competed in men's singles, won the silver medal at the 1930 European Figure Skating Championships in Berlin.

He began coaching in 1932. He coached Sonia Henie at the 1935 World Figure Skating Championships.

In 1937, he moved to Ontario, Canada, where he began a four-decade coaching career at the Minto Skating Club. He was one of the first coaches of 1948 Olympic champion Barbara Ann Scott, and also worked in Vancouver, Connecticut and Lake Placid. He has been recognised for raising the level of figure skating in North America.

In April 1977, Gold died in a Toronto hospital from injuries caused by a fire at his apartment.

His daughter, Frances Gold Lynn, was a figure skater who placed fourth at the 1962 U.S. Figure Skating Championships and later became a coach. He was inducted into the Canadian Figure Skating Hall of Fame in its inaugural class of 1990.

Competitive highlights

References 

1909 births
1977 deaths
Czechoslovak male single skaters
Czechoslovak emigrants to Canada
Czech figure skating coaches
Canadian figure skating coaches
Deaths from fire
Figure skaters from Prague